Thiruvananthapuram Outer Area Growth Corridor (OAGC) (also known as: Trivandrum Outer Ring Road) is a proposed  6 lane road in Thiruvananthapuram, the capital city of Kerala, India. It is part of the Capital Region Development Programme-II (CRDP-II) in Thiruvananthapuram City which comes under the Centre’s Bharatmala Pariyojana scheme.

The OAGC starts at National Highway 66 from Navaikulam and ends at Vizhinjam with a length of 65.630km. There is also a link road connecting Thekadda to Mangalapuram at a length of 13.250km.
Apart from the 70m wide six-lane road and a 10m wide service road, the corridor will also have special economic development zones making it a hub for logistics, IT and entertainment. This includes logistics hub of 60 acres at North Mangalapuram and south Neeramankuzhy. Andoorkonam (48 acres) and Panthalacode (80 acres) are the economical and commercial zones. The proposed alignment is through Navaikulam, Kilimanoor, Thekkada,Ozhukupara,Vembayam, Mangalapuram, Pothencode, Nedumangad , Aruvikkara, Cheriyakonni, Chowalloor, Vilappilsala, Maranalloor, Ooruttambalam, Madavoorpara, Chavadinada, Venganoor, Kalluvettankuzhi and Vizhinjam.

References

Roads in Kerala
Transport in Thiruvananthapuram